The 2019 Austrian Darts Open was the fifth of thirteen PDC European Tour events on the 2019 PDC Pro Tour. The tournament took place at Steiermarkhalle, Premstätten, Austria, from 3–5 May 2019. It featured a field of 48 players and £140,000 in prize money, with £25,000 going to the winner.

Jonny Clayton was the defending champion after defeating Gerwyn Price 8–5 in the final of the 2018 tournament, but he was defeated 6–2 in the second round by Tytus Kanik.

Michael van Gerwen won his third Austrian Darts Open title (and his 32nd in total on the European Tour) with an 8–7 win over Ian White in the final.

Prize money
This is how the prize money is divided:

 Seeded players who lose in the second round do not receive this prize money on any Orders of Merit.

Qualification and format
The top 16 entrants from the PDC ProTour Order of Merit on 4 April will automatically qualify for the event and will be seeded in the second round.

The remaining 32 places will go to players from six qualifying events – 18 from the UK Tour Card Holder Qualifier (held on 12 April), six from the European Tour Card Holder Qualifier (held on 12 April), two from the West & South European Associate Member Qualifier (held on 2 May), four from the Host Nation Qualifier (held on 2 May), one from the Nordic & Baltic Associate Member Qualifier (held on 1 February) and one from the East European Associate Member Qualifier (held on 9 March).

From 2019, the Host Nation, Nordic & Baltic and East European Qualifiers will only be available to non-tour card holders. Any tour card holders from the applicable regions will have to play the main European Qualifier.

The following players will take part in the tournament:

Top 16
  Michael van Gerwen (champion)
  Gerwyn Price (quarter-finals)
  Ian White (runner-up)
  Daryl Gurney (semi-finals)
  Adrian Lewis (quarter-finals)
  Rob Cross (third round)
  Mensur Suljović (third round)
  Peter Wright (quarter-finals)
  Jonny Clayton (second round)
  James Wade (semi-finals)
  Michael Smith (second round)
  Dave Chisnall (second round)
  Joe Cullen (second round)
  Max Hopp (second round)
  Ricky Evans (second round)
  Darren Webster (second round)

UK Qualifier
  Mervyn King (second round)
  Andrew Gilding (first round)
  Steve Beaton (quarter-finals)
  Devon Petersen (first round)
  Stephen Bunting (third round)
  Conan Whitehead (first round)
  Steve Lennon (second round)
  Jamie Bain (first round)
  John Henderson (second round)
  Mark Webster (third round)
  Keegan Brown (third round)
  Nathan Aspinall (third round)
  Chris Dobey (second round)
  Ross Smith (first round)
  Mark Barilli (first round)
  Jamie Hughes (second round)
  Ryan Searle (second round)
  Mark Wilson (first round)

European Qualifier
  Darius Labanauskas (third round)
 
  Dirk van Duijvenbode (first round)
  Tytus Kanik (third round)
  Jeffrey de Zwaan (second round)
  Kim Huybrechts (first round)

West/South European Qualifier
 
  Diogo Portela (first round)

Host Nation Qualifier
  Dietmar Burger (first round)
  Michael Rasztovits (first round)
  Benjamin Fasching (first round)
  Patrick Tringler (first round)

Nordic & Baltic Qualifier
  Johan Engström (first round)

East European Qualifier
  Boris Koltsov (second round)

Draw

References 

2019 PDC Pro Tour
2019 PDC European Tour
2019 in Austrian sport
May 2019 sports events in Austria